Hellegrundbach is a river of Lower Saxony, Germany.

The Hellegrundbach springs northwest of Nüxei, a district of Bad Sachsa. Southwest of Nüxei, it discharges into the Ichte (upstream of this confluence called Steinacher Bach).

See also
List of rivers of Lower Saxony

References

Rivers of Lower Saxony
Rivers of Germany